Dr. Saman Kumara Ranjith Weerasinghe (born 17 October 1961) is a Sri Lankan medical doctor, diplomat and businessman. He is former Sri Lankan Ambassador to the Russian Federation and a recipient of the Order of Honour (Russia). 

Weerasinghe is the Chairman of Mos-Lanka Holdings Group. He has also served as the vice president of the Russia – Sri Lanka Friendship Society and as the International Secretary of the Russia – Sri Lanka Friendship Society. He is the President of Dayaka Sabhawa of the Kelaniya Raja Maha Temple

Early life and education
Saman Kumara Ranjith Weerasinghe is the son of Sirisena Weeerasinghe and Allen Weerasinghe of Tangalle in Southern Sri Lanka. He received his initial education at Tangalle College and then joined Mahinda College, Galle to receive his primary and secondary education.  Weerasinghe pursued higher studies in Russia after winning a scholarship in 1980s. He graduated with a First Class Honours Degree from the Moscow Medical Academy in Russia. Weerasinghe developed strong connections with Russia during his academic career and became an advocate for stronger Sri Lanka-Russia relationship.

Career
After completing his higher education he served as a consultant, to the international section of the Moscow State Medical Academy. Weerasinghe was responsible for introducing several attractive investment and trade opportunities to Sri Lanka through the Russian business community. He development of economic and cultural relationships between Russia and Sri Lanka.

Weerasinghe was an advisor to former president Mahinda Rajapaksa. In addition, Weerasinghe holds honorary positions, of General Secretary of the Sri Lanka-Russia Friendship Society, and Deputy President of the Russia Friendship Association. In June 2013, Weerasinghe was awarded the Order of Honour (Russia), in recognition of his contribution to develop and strengthen economic, cultural and humanitarian cooperation between Sri Lanka and Russia during the past 30 years.

See also
List of Sri Lankan non-career diplomats

References

External links
 Dr. Saman Weerasinghe foundation

Living people
1961 births
Sinhalese businesspeople
Sri Lankan diplomats
Alumni of Mahinda College
Moscow State University alumni
I.M. Sechenov First Moscow State Medical University alumni
Sri Lankan expatriates in the Soviet Union